Justice Bonham may refer to:

Benjamin F. Bonham, chief justice of the Oregon Supreme Court
Milledge Lipscomb Bonham, chief justice of the South Carolina Supreme Court